Norway competed at the 2012 Summer Paralympics in London, United Kingdom from August 29 to September 9, 2012.

Medallists

Archery

Men

|-
|align=left|John Olav Johansen
|align=left|Ind. Compound Open
|642
|15
|L 0–6
|colspan=5|did not advance
|}

Athletics

Men’s Field Events

Boccia

Cycling

Road

Men

Track

Time Trial

Individual Pursuit

Equestrian

Sailing

Shooting

Swimming

Women

Table tennis

Men

Women

See also
2012 Summer Paralympics
Norway at the Paralympics
Norway at the 2012 Summer Olympics

Notes

Nations at the 2012 Summer Paralympics
2012